Nikita Sergeyevich Alexeev, sometimes transliterated as Alexeyev, (born December 27, 1981) is a Russian former professional ice hockey forward who last played in the Kontinental Hockey League with Severstal Cherepovets. He formerly played in the National Hockey League (NHL) with the Tampa Bay Lightning and the Chicago Blackhawks. He was a first round pick, 8th overall in the 2000 NHL Entry Draft for the Lightning.

Playing career 
Alexeev came to North America in 1998 to play for the Erie Otters of the Ontario Hockey League (OHL). He was drafted by the Tampa Bay Lightning 8th overall in the 2000 NHL Entry Draft. He made his NHL debut in the 2001-02 season, and split the next two seasons between the Lightning and AHL affiliate, the Springfield Falcons.

Early in the 2003–04 season, Alexeev suffered a major shoulder injury which caused him to miss the rest of the season as the Lightning went on to claim their first Stanley Cup. Alexeev played a season in Russia before in the 2006–07 season, he returned to NHL and was a regular in the Lightning lineup. However, after 63 games, he was traded to the Chicago Blackhawks at the trade deadline. The Blackhawks chose not to offer Alexeev a contract in 2007, making him a free agent.

Alexeev unable to live up to his draft status, ended his NHL tenure and returned to sign with Ak Bars Kazan of the Kontinental Hockey League (KHL). Alexeev won the Gagarin Cup as champion of the KHL twice with Ak Bars, and scored the cup winning goal in 2010.

Career statistics

Awards and honours

References

External links 
 

1981 births
Living people
Ak Bars Kazan players
Avangard Omsk players
Chicago Blackhawks players
Erie Otters players
Hershey Bears players
National Hockey League first-round draft picks
People from Murmansk
Russian ice hockey left wingers
Severstal Cherepovets players
Springfield Falcons players
Tampa Bay Lightning draft picks
Tampa Bay Lightning players
Sportspeople from Murmansk Oblast